Zapanta is a surname. Notable people with the surname include:

 Albert C. Zapanta (born 1941), American businessman
 Eleuterio Zapanta (1916–1965), Filipino boxer

See also
 Zapata (surname)

Tagalog-language surnames